The Korisliiga Defensive Player of the Year is an annual award that is handed out to the best defensive player in a given Korisliiga season.

Winners

References

Defensive Player